Lendići may refer to:

 Lendići (Gračanica)
 Lendići (Jajce)